The Diocese of Balanga is one of the 72 dioceses of the Catholic Church in the Philippines. It was established on March 17, 1975, by Pope Paul VI.

The diocese comprises the whole civil province of Bataan, with 37 parishes, one minor basilica, chaplaincy, quasi-parish and chapel, and 4 vicariates. It has 11 schools as of 2017, with 10 are operated by the diocese's Diocesan Schools of Bataan (DSOB). The Diocesan Shrine and Cathedral-Parish of St. Joseph, Husband of Mary in Aguire Street, Poblacion, Balanga, serves as the seat of the diocese. It is part of the Ecclesiastical Province of San Fernando, Pampanga.

The titular patron of the diocese is Saint Joseph, Husband of Mary, whose feast day falls on March 19. The city fiesta is celebrated on April 28.

History
The Diocese of Balanga was established on March 17, 1975, by Pope Paul VI through the papal bull Quoniam Recte Universum. It comprises the entire civil province of Bataan, the smallest among the provinces of Central Luzon. The province is a peninsula jutting out to sea, with Manila Bay to the east, South China Sea to the west, and the province of Zambales to the north.

Before this, the region was divided into two parts: the Corregimiento of Mariveles and the Province of Pampanga. The towns of Mariveles, Bagac, Morong and Maragondon, Cavite, comprised the Corregimiento of Mariveles that was under the jurisdiction of the Recollect Order of the Roman Catholic Church. The province of Pampanga included the towns of Orion, Pilar, Balanga, Abucay, Samal, Orani, Llana Hermosa and San Juan de Dinalupihan. The latter group was under the charge of the Dominican Order. Limay, the twelfth town of Bataan, was named only in 1917.

The topography of the province has made most of the inhabitants farmers or fishermen, with a sprinkling of merchants, factory workers and professionals. Recent years, however, have seen the development of manufacturing industries in the province, particularly the Free Zone in Mariveles which has brought an influx of workers from other provinces and improved living conditions of its own workers.

Historically, Bataan is most remembered, along with the island of Corregidor, as the main scene of action in the Philippines during the Second World War. These places are strategic in guarding the entrance to Manila Bay. The surrender of Filipino and American soldiers to overwhelming Japanese forces marked the Fall of Bataan in 1942. A war memorial, Dambana ng Kagitingan, now stands to honor the men who fought and died in that last stand.

On 2025, the diocese will celebrate its 50th anniversary.

Diocesan coat-of-arms
The miter symbolizes the pastoral authority of a bishop, which he will be exercising within the province.

The three long-stemmed lilies, symbols of Saint Joseph, the patron saint of the cathedral. According to legend the staves of the many suitors of the Blessed Virgin Mary were gathered in the temple; the staff of Joseph bloomed to signify that he was the one chosen by God to be the head of the Holy Family. Blue signifies peace, justice and tranquility. Joseph was called "just" by the Gospel. He was a placid and silent man, too.

The three youths reading books. Bataan, the civil province co-terminus with the Diocese, means the Land of the Youth, the hope of the Fatherland. The books being read by each are respectively marked VIA, meaning Christ The Way; VERITAS, meaning Christ The Truth; and VITA, meaning Christ The Life. Overhead is the golden sun with the letters IHS, meaning Jesus. Our Lord Jesus Christ said, "I am the Light of the world" (John 8:12; 9:5). He is the "real light that comes into the world and shines on all men" (John 1:9). He is the Lamb, the lamp of the Celestial Jerusalem (Revelation 21:23), the Sun of Justice (Malachi 4:2). He also said, "I am The Way, I am The Truth, I am The Life" (John 14:6). So in the light of Christ that is explained by the church, we must study and follow and live Christ who is the way, the truth and the life. This study entails seriousness, this following of Christ means patience, this living of Christ requires perseverance—virtues signified by the red color.

50th Anniversary coat of arms
The coat of arms for the diocese's 50th anniversary also has a miter which symbolizes the bishop's pastoral authority which will be exercising within the province of Bataan and three-stemmed lilies which is the symbol of Saint Joseph.

The three red crosses symbolizes the Holy Trinity (God the Father, Jesus Christ, and the Holy Spirit), four small crosses inside a circle symbolizing the past and current bishops of the diocese (Bishops Celso Guevarra (November 8, 1975–April 8, 1998), Honesto Ongtioco (June 18, 1998–August 28, 2003), Socrates Villegas (July 3, 2004–November 4, 2009), and Ruperto Santos (July 8, 2010–present)), seven red and blue lines signifies the 7 sacraments of the Catholic Church, symbols of Dominican and Augustinian orders at the left and right side of the miter indicating that they are the missionaries who went to the province in order to teach the faith, with Dominicans built the churches of Abucay, Samal, Balanga, Orani, Pilar, Hermosa , and Orion, while the Augustinians built the Morong, Bagac, and Mariveles church. The number 50 and the years 1975 and 2025 represents the 50th anniversary of the diocese, with 1975 indicate the diocese's founding and 2025 for its 50th year. At the lower left is the letter "M" symbol (which is also used on the coat of arms of Bishop Ruperto Santos) symbolizing Virgin Mary serving as the diocese's secondary patroness under the name of Virgen Milagrosa de Orani and showing the devotion of the Bataan people to her. At the right is the map of Bataan from which the diocese has jurisdiction and authority with. At the bottom is a golden banner which has the text "Magtipon (Gather), Maglakbay (Travel), at Maghasik (Sow)" which are the theme for its 50th anniversary. "The daughters of kings, women of honor, are maidens in your courts. And standing beside you, glistening in your pure and golden glory, is the beautiful bride-to-be!" comes from Psalms 45, the word of God which is a guide for the celebration of 50 years of the diocese.

Schools
St. Catherine of Siena Academy, Samal (1960)
St. John Academy, Dinalupihan (1960)
Holy Rosary Parochial Institute, Orani (1963)
St. Michael the Archangel Academy, Orion (1982)
St. Nicholas Catholic School of Mariveles (1984)
Our Lady of the Pillar Parochial School, Morong (1992)
St. Peter of Verona Academy, Hermosa (1998)
Blessed Regina Protmann Catholic School, Mt. View, Mariveles (2007)
St. James Catholic School of Morong (2008)
Virgen Milagrosa Del Rosario College Seminary (2015)
Colegio Santa Catarina de Alexandria, Bagac (2017)

Bishop and Apostolic/Diocesan Administrator

Bishop of Balanga

The diocese is headed by a bishop which is appointed by the pope like other dioceses and installed as bishop of the diocese on his installation date, with his installation makes him become Bishop of Balanga and marks the start of his term as the diocese's bishop. The seat of the bishop is at the Diocesan Shrine and Cathedral-Parish of St. Joseph, Husband of Mary, also known as Balanga Cathedral, in Aguire Street, Poblacion, Balanga which is under the patronage of the Saint Joseph, Husband of Mary. The bishop's residence, however, is located at P. Paterno Street, also in Poblacion, Balanga.

Bishop Celso N. Guevarra was appointed by Pope Paul VI on June 4, 1975, and became the diocese's first bishop on November 8, 1975, eight months after its founding. He served as bishop of the diocese until his retirement on April 8, 1998. Guevarra is the longest-serving Bishop of Balanga, served for 22 years and 308 days.

Due to the retirement of Bishop Celso Guevarra, Pope John Paul II appointed Honesto Ongtioco as the diocese's second bishop and became bishop of the diocese two months later on June 18, 1998. Ongtioco served as bishop of Balanga until he became Bishop of Cubao on August 28, 2003. On May 3, 2004, Socrates Villegas was appointed by the same pope as the diocese's bishop and became the third bishop on July 3, 2004. Villegas served as the bishop of the diocese until he became archbishop of Lingayen-Dagupan in Pangasinan on November 4, 2009. Bishops Honesto Ongtioco and Socrates Villegas both served as the diocese's bishop for 5 years.

Due to Socrates Villegas became archbishop of Lingayen-Dagupan on November 4, 2009, which ended his term as bishop of Balanga, Msgr. Victor de la Cruz Ocampo (later became Bishop of Gumaca in Quezon six years later on September 3, 2015 until his death on March 16, 2023) was named as the diocesan administrator of the diocese and served the position until Bishop Ruperto Santos, appointed by Pope Benedict XVI as bishop on April 1, 2010, ordained on June 24, 2010, and became the diocese's fourth and current bishop on July 8, 2010.

The diocese is currently headed by Bishop Ruperto Santos since July 8, 2010. Santos is the diocese's second-longest serving bishop after Bishop Celso N. Guevarra since December 2015, and the longest-serving living bishop of the diocese. He is also the first bishop to serve as parish priest of one of the diocese's churches, as he serves as parish priest of St. Nicholas of Tolentino parish church in Mariveles since June 5, 2020.

List of Bishops of Balanga

Apostolic/Diocesan Administrator
When the diocese becomes vacant or a successor is not yet installed, either an apostolic administrator which is appointed by the pope or a diocesan administrator may temporarily govern the diocese until a successor is installed.

List of Apostolic/Diocesan Administrators

Timeline of bishops and apostolic/diocesan administrators

Priests of the diocese who became bishops
Victor C. Ocampo, became Bishop of Gumaca on September 3, 2015.

See also
Catholic Church in the Philippines
List of Catholic dioceses in the Philippines

References

External links
 Roman Catholic Diocese of Balanga Official Website

 
Christian organizations established in 1975
Balanga
Balanga
Religion in Bataan
Balanga, Bataan